"Jojo Action" is a song by German Eurodance group Mr. President, released on 9 June 1997 as the first single from their third album, Night Club (1997). The song was a hit in Europe, peaking at number-one in Hungary, number three in Austria, number four in Germany, number five in Switzerland and number eight in Finland. In the UK, it reached number 73. Outside Europe, the song peaked at number 78 in Australia. It was certified gold in Germany, with a sale of 250,000 units. A music video was also produced to promote the single, featuring the group performing in a night club.

Critical reception
Pan-European magazine Music & Media wrote, "This band is enjoying singles success with different titles in various parts of Europe. Last year's continental smash, Coco Jamboo, is now performing quite nicely in the U.K.. This song, which is at least as infectious as its predecessor, is helping establish the band as a permanent feature on the Eurochart, and entered the German singles listing at number six. 

Head of music at Frankfurt-based commercial CHR network Radio FFH, covering the whole of the state of Hessen, Ralph Blasberg considered the song a 'must play'. "This song is the type of pop/dance crossover material that our core audience loves and therefore it fits our format perfectly. We conduct a lot of listener research; we found that this song with its feelgood, summery flavour is just perfect for us. The fact it entered our singles chart straight at position six seems to confirm our research." Gerald Martinez from New Straits Times felt the song "delivers a spicy taste. It swings in a colourful kaleidoscope of house, Latin American rhythms and pop grooves. Very hooky."

Track listings

 CD single, Germany (1997)
"Jojo Action" (radio edit) — 3:50
"Jojo Action" (extended version) — 5:55

 Maxi-CD single, Germany (1997)
"Jojo Action" (radio edit) — 3:50
"Jojo Action" (extended version) — 5:55
"Jojo Action" (house version) — 5:07
"Jojo Action "(Kraftwerk mix) — 6:38
"Jojo Action" (Jazzy Funky Style) — 3:55
"Jojo Action" (Put It on Another version) — 3:39
"Jojo Action" (instrumental) — 3:51 

 12-inch vinyl, Germany (1997)
"Jojo Action" (extended version) — 5:55
"Jojo Action" (house version) — 5:07
"Jojo Action" (instrumental) — 3:51
"Jojo Action" (radio edit) — 3:50
"Jojo Action" (Kraftwerk mix) — 6:38
"Jojo Action" (Jazzy Funky Style) — 3:55
"Jojo Action" (Put It on Another version) — 3:39

 12-inch maxi-single, Europe (1998)
"Jojo Action" (Candy Girls club mix) — 6:48
"Jojo Action" (radio edit) — 3:48
"Jojo Action" (Mondo's "Bosomania" 12-inch Pumper) — 7:08
"Jojo Action" (Blown Up mix) — 5:15

Charts

Weekly charts

Year-end charts

Certifications

Release history

References

1997 singles
1997 songs
Mr. President (band) songs
Number-one singles in Hungary
Warner Music Group singles